Krónika is the sole Hungarian-language Romanian newspaper of national circulation. It is based in Cluj-Napoca. The circulation is approximately 80,000.

External links 
 Online edition

Newspapers published in Cluj-Napoca